Ilhéu dos Pássaros is an uninhabited rocky islet in the bay of Mindelo, São Vicente Island, Cape Verde. It lies between the Porto Grande Bay and the Canal de São Vicente, the channel of the Atlantic Ocean that separates the islands of São Vicente and Santo Antão. There is a lighthouse on the islet.

Ilhéu dos Pássaros was depicted on a Cape Verdean $500 escudo bill issued between 1992 and 2000. The Cape Verdean author Orlanda Amarílis published Ilhéu dos Pássaros, a collection of short stories, in 1983.

References

Uninhabited islands of Cape Verde